Aleksa Matić (born 20 September 2002) is a Serbian footballer who currently plays as a midfielder for Voždovac.

Career statistics

Club

Notes

References

2002 births
Living people
Serbian footballers
Serbia youth international footballers
Association football midfielders
Serbian expatriate footballers
Expatriate footballers in Belarus
Serbian First League players
FK Vojvodina players
Red Star Belgrade footballers
RFK Grafičar Beograd players
FC Minsk players
FK Voždovac players